The Queen of Prussia was the queen consort of the ruler of the Kingdom of Prussia, from its establishment in 1701 to its abolition in 1918.  As all rulers of Prussia had to be male, there was never a Queen regnant of Prussia. Until 1806, the Queen of Prussia was also Electress of Brandenburg; after 1871, she was also German Empress. Until 1772, her title was Queen in Prussia (see King in Prussia).

Duchess of Prussia

Queens in Prussia

Queens of Prussia

Spouses of the pretenders

See also

List of consorts of Brandenburg
List of German queens
Princess of Orange
Princess of Neuchâtel
Duchess of Saxe-Lauenburg
Grand Duchess of Posen
List of monarchs of Prussia

 
 
Prussia, List of consorts of
Prussia, List of consorts of
Consorts
Prussia, List of consorts of